The second impeachment inquiry against Andrew Johnson was an impeachment inquiry against United States President Andrew Johnson.
It followed a previous inquiry in 1867. The second inquiry, unlike the first (which was run by the House Committee on the Judiciary), was run by the House Select Committee on Reconstruction. The second inquiry ran from its authorization on January 27, 1868 until the House Select Committee on Reconstruction reported to Congress on February 22, 1868.

By early February, it appeared the prospect of an impeachment advancing was improbable. This changed when, on February 21, 1868, Johnson attempted to dismiss and replace Secretary of War Edwin Stanton in violation of the Tenure of Office Act. That day, an impeachment resolution was forwarded to the select committee. The following day, the select committee approved a slightly amended version of the resolution in a party-line 7–2 vote (with all Republican members voting in favor of the impeachment resolution and Democratic members voting against it). On February 24, 1868, the impeachment resolution was passed by the House, thereby impeaching Johnson. Johnson was later acquitted in his impeachment trial.

Background

Some Radical Republicans had entertained the thought of impeaching President Andrew Johnson since as early as 1866. However, the Republican Party was divided on the prospect of impeachment, with moderate Republicans in the party, who held a plurality, widely opposing it at this point. The radicals were more in favor of impeachment, as their plans for strong reform in reconstruction were greatly imperiled by Johnson.

Several attempts were made by Radical Republicans to initiate impeachment, but these were initially successfully rebuffed by moderate Republicans in party leadership. Radical Republicans continued to seek Johnson's impeachment, introducing impeachment resolutions in spite of a rule put in place for the House Republican caucus by the moderate Republican leadership in December 1866 requiring that a majority of House Republicans House Committee on the Judiciary would be required to approve any measure regarding impeachment in party caucus prior to it being considered in the House. Moderate Republicans often stifled these resolutions by referring them to committees, however. On January 7, 1867, Benjamin F. Loan, John R. Kelso, and James Mitchell Ashley each introduced three separate impeachment resolutions against Johnson. the House refused to hold debate or vote on either Loan or Kelso's resolutions. However, they did allow a vote on Ashley's impeachment-related resolution. Unlike the other two impeachment bills introduced that day (which would have outright impeached Johnson), Ashley's bill offered a specific outline of how an impeachment process would proceed, and it did not start with an immediate impeachment. Rather than going to a direct vote on impeaching the president, his resolution would instruct the Judiciary Committee to "inquire into the official conduct of Andrew Johnson", investigating what it called Johnson's "corruptly used" powers, including his political appointments, pardons for ex-Confederates, and his vetoes of legislation. The resolution passed in the House 108–39. It was seen as offering Republicans a chance to register their displeasure with Johnson, without actually formally impeaching him. This launched the first impeachment inquiry against Andrew Johnson. After the end of the 39th Congress, the first impeachment inquiry was renewed in the 40th Congress. On November 25, 1867, the House Committee on the Judiciary voted to recommend impeachment. However, when put to a full vote of the House, the House voted 57–108 against impeaching Johnson on December 7, 1867, with more Republicans voting against impeachment than for it.

Vote authorizing the inquiry

On January 27, 1868, Rufus P. Spalding moved that the rules be suspended so that he could present a resolution resolving, 

The motion to allow consideration of the resolution was agreed to by a vote of 103–37, and the House voted to approve the resolution by a vote of 99–31. This launched a new inquiry into Johnson run by the Select Committee on Reconstruction.

No Democrats voted for the resolution, while the only Republicans who cast votes against it were Elihu B. Washburne and William Windom. 57 members were absent from the vote (39 Republicans, 17 Democrats, and 1 Conservative Republican). Additionally, Speaker Schuyler Colfax (a Republican) did not vote, as House rules do not require the speaker to vote during ordinary legislative proceedings, unless their vote would be decisive or if the vote is being cast by ballot.

Membership of House Select Committee on Reconstruction during the inquiry
The following is a table of the members during the second session, during which the inquiry took place.

When the House had previously voted in December 1867 (at the end of the first impeachment inquiry) on the impeachment resolution forwarded to it by the House Committee on the Judiciary, four of these select committee members (Republicans Boutwell, Farnsworth, Stevens, and Paine) had voted in support of impeaching Johnson, while five of these select committee members (Republicans Beaman, Bingham, Hulburd and Democrats Beck and Brooks) had voted against impeachment.

Inquiry

At the time of the inquiry, Radical Republican Thaddeus Stevens was chair of the House Select Committee on Reconstruction. At the time of the inquiry, Stevens was of advanced age and poor health.

The select committee also looked into correspondence between President Johnson and Ulysses S. Grant, particularly what orders Grant had been given by Johnson when Grant was his acting sectretary of war. Grant came to a committee meeting on February 8, but was not examined. In early February, heated letters between Grant and Johnson had been published in the press, adding further intrigue and fuel to the investigation.

The select committee interviewed witnesses. One witness interviewed multiple times was Jerome B. Stillson, a reporter with the New York World who had conducted regular interviews with President Johnson. 

Stevens successfully persuaded the House to, on February 10, 1868, pass a resolution transferring all records from the previous impeachment inquiry and any further responsibility on impeachment away from the Committee on the Judiciary and to the Select Committee on Reconstruction.

Initial rejection of impeachment
Stevens believed that the letters between Johnson and Grant that had been published in the press proved that Johnson had attempted to convince Grant to act in violation of the Tenure of Office Act. In the morning of February 13, 1868, the select committee held a brief session. Stevens announced that he desired to test the subject of impeachment in the select committee, stating that he believed that the investigation had gone far enough and the time for action to be taken had come. Stevens introduced to the select committee a resolution to impeach the president for high crimes and misdemeanors. The resolution did not specify what high crimes and misdemeanors had been committed. Along with the resolution, he also presented the select committee with a report arguing for impeachment. The chief reason for impeaching Johnson given in the report was that Johnson had (allegedly) acted with intent to violate the Tenure of Office Act.

John Bingham (R– OH), a moderate Republican, held the balance of power on the select committee. Bingham motioned to lay on the table both the resolution, the report, and the discussion of impeachment. Stevens asked, before a vote, that the vote on the motion be recorded so that the nation would know who was in support of impeachment and who was not. In what Stevens had framed to be a de facto proxy vote on impeachment, three select committee members (Republicans Fernando C. Beaman, and John F. Farnsworth, and Stevens) voted against tabling (for impeachment) and six select committee members (Republicans Bignham, Halbert E. Paine, Calvin T. Hulburd and Democrats James B. Beck and James Brooks) voted to table (against impeachment).

The next day, pro-impeachment Republican committee members Fernando C. Beaman, George S. Boutwell, John F. Farnsworth, and Thaddeus Stevens met to discuss how to proceed towards impeachment after this setback. However, Stevens concluded that it was a lost cause. This momentarily appeared to mark the death of the prospect of impeaching Johnson and the end of the revived effort to impeach Johnson.

Select committee approval of an impeachment resolution

On February 21, 1868, Johnson disregarded the Tenure of Office Act by moving to dismiss Edwin Stanton as U.S secretary of war and replace him with Lorenzo Thomas as the ad interim secretary of war. That day, Stevens submitted a resolution to the House resolving that the evidence taken on impeachment by the previous (1867) impeachment inquiry run by the Committee on the Judiciary be referred to the House Select Committee on Reconstruction, and that the select committee "have leave to report at any time", which was approved by the House. Also on February 21, a one sentence resolution to impeach Johnson, written by John Covode, was presented to the House. The resolution read, "Resolved, that Andrew Johnson, President of the United States, be impeached of high crimes and misdemeanors." George S. Boutwell motioned that the resolution be referred to the House Select Committee on Reconstruction, and it was.

An amended version of Covode's resolution was rapidly drawn up by the Select Committee on Reconstruction. In the morning February 22, 1868, by a party-line vote of 7–2, the select committee voted to refer a slightly amended version of Covode's impeachment resolution to the full House. The amended impeachment resolution read, 

Remarks made when the full House debated the resolution indicate that the Republican members of the select committee's support for impeachment was motivated by Johnson's attempt to remove Secretary of War Stanton, which they regarded as a violation of the Tenure of Office Act.

Majority report of the select committee
A majority report in support of impeaching Johnson for high crimes and misdemeanors was written and was signed by all of the select committee's Republican members. The dissenting Democratic members did not write a minority view, with James Brooks claiming that he had not had enough time to prepare one.

Subsequent impeachment and trial

At 3pm on February 22, Stevens presented from the House Select Committee on Reconstruction the impeachment resolution along with the majority report. The impeachment resolution was put to a vote on February 24, 1868, three days after Johnson's dismissal of Stanton. The House of Representatives voted 126–47 (with 17 members not voting) in favor of a resolution to impeach the president for high crimes and misdemeanors, marking the first time that a president of the United States had been impeached. On February 25, the House (by a vote of 105–36) passed a resolution by George Boutwell that the House Select Committee on Reconstruction be authorized to sit during sessions of the House, ahead of proceedings that included the consideration of impeachment managers and the passage of articles of impeachment. Johnson was narrowly acquitted in his Senate trial with a 35 in favor of conviction to 19 votes in favor acquittal, one vote short of the two-thirds majority needed for a conviction.

See also
Timeline of the impeachment of Andrew Johnson

References

Inquiry 2
1868 in the United States
Johnson, Andrew 2